The 2003 European Open was a professional snooker tournament and the fifth of eight WPBSA ranking events in the 2002/2003 season, following the Welsh Open. It was held from 11 to 16 March 2003 at the Palace Hotel in Torquay, England. This marked the first and only time when any of the editions of this tournament was not held outside the British Isles. Ronnie O'Sullivan won his 12th ranking title by defeating Stephen Hendry 9–6 in the final. O'Sullivan went on to win back-to-back ranking titles – his next coming at the 2003 Irish Masters, just two weeks later, where he triumphed over John Higgins in a deciding frame.

Tournament summary 
Defending champion Stephen Hendry was the number 1 seed with World Champion Peter Ebdon seeded 2. The remaining places were allocated to players based on the world rankings.

Prize fund
The breakdown of prize money for this year is shown below:

Winner: £44,000
Final: £22,000
Semi-final: £11,000
Quarter-final: £6,800
Last 16: £4,000
Last 32: £2,600
Last 48: £1,450
Last 64: £1,050

Last 80: £700
Last 96: £375
Stage one highest break: £1,000
Stage two highest break: £3,000
Stage one maximum break: £5,000
Stage two maximum break: £20,000
Total: £250,000

Main draw

Final

Qualifying

Round 1 
Best of 9 frames

Round 2–5

Century breaks

Qualifying stage centuries

 140  Barry Pinches
 138, 111  Robert Milkins
 133, 133, 101  Adrian Gunnell
 131, 115  Stephen Maguire
 130  Antony Bolsover
 128  Marco Fu
 128  Ali Carter
 121  Jin Long
 119  David Gray
 114, 103  Stefan Mazrocis
 114  Andrew Higginson

 113, 111  Troy Shaw
 113  Mike Dunn
 113  Luke Fisher
 109, 106  Barry Hawkins
 108  Shaun Murphy
 101  Mark Davis
 101  Bjorn Haneveer
 100  Sean Storey
 100  Rod Lawler
 100  Munraj Pal

Televised stage centuries

 142, 140, 139, 129, 126, 121, 112, 102  Ronnie O'Sullivan
 136  Mark King
 132  Paul Hunter
 123, 117, 110, 101  Stephen Hendry
 118  Mark Williams

 113, 111  Peter Ebdon
 112  John Higgins
 102  Robin Hull
 101  Stephen Lee

References 

2003
European Open
European Open
European Open
Snooker competitions in England
Sport in Torquay